Marijash (Marijaš )  or Bogdaš (Богдаш)  is a mountain in Kosovo in the Prokletije range. The mountain is located near the Montenegrin border.

Notes

References 

Mountains of Kosovo
Accursed Mountains
Two-thousanders of Kosovo